America Sings was an attraction at Disneyland in Anaheim, California, United States, from 1974 to 1988. It featured a cast of audio animatronics animals that entertained the audience by singing songs from various periods in America's musical history, often in a humorous fashion.

History

America Sings opened on June 29, 1974, replacing the General Electric-sponsored Tomorrowland attraction Carousel of Progress, which had moved to the Magic Kingdom at the Walt Disney World Resort in 1973. America Sings used the same Carousel Theater as its predecessor. The building had an outer ring of six theaters, connected by divider walls, that revolved mechanically about every four minutes around the six fixed stages in the center of the building.

Unlike Disneyland's Carousel of Progress, which rotated clockwise, America Sings rotated in a counterclockwise direction.  Also, unlike Carousel of Progress, America Sings only used the lower level of the Carousel Theater. The upper level was eventually used to house the SuperSpeed Tunnel in 1977 (which later became themed to the Game Grid from the 1982 film Tron) that the PeopleMover transportation attraction passed through.

Written primarily by Marc Davis and Al Bertino, America Sings featured a singing cast of audio-animatronics animals. The show's Masters of Ceremonies were an American bald eagle named Sam (voiced by Burl Ives) and an owl named Ollie (voiced by Sam Edwards). Eagle Sam was designed by Disney animator Marc Davis, as were the other characters. Eagle Sam is completely separate from the Sam the Olympic Eagle character designed a decade later by C. Robert Moore (also a Disney employee) for the 1984 Summer Olympics.

Like the Carousel of Progress, the first and the last scenes of America Sings involved the loading and unloading of guests, while the other four scenes, or "acts," depicted a particular era. However, the identical load and unload theaters each featured a small curtained gazebo with a backdrop showing a park. The curtains would open to reveal Sam and Ollie standing on a two-level podium, with Sam standing on the higher level, introducing or closing the show.

Between each act, as the theater rotated, the lights blacked out, and the theater illuminated with flashing stars; during the rotations, Sam sang about the next era the audience was about to enter, reprising the chorus of "Yankee Doodle".

Also, at some point in each act, the Weasel would suddenly appear on the scene, spouting the title line, "Pop, Goes the Weasel!" for a total of five times. At the very end of the show, he changed the line to, "Goodbye, Goes the Weasel!"

The characters in America Sings were patterned after the characters from the concept art for an animated movie called Chanticleer that Walt Disney scrapped in the 1960s.

Death of Deborah Gail Stone

On July 8, 1974, nine days after the attraction opened, an 18-year-old hostess, named Deborah Gail Stone, was accidentally crushed to death between two walls of the building between 10:35 p.m. and 10:40 p.m. A narrow channel between a stationary wall and a rotating wall was open and Stone either fell, stepped backwards, or tried to jump from one stage to the other as the rotating wall began to move (it moved every 2 to 4 minutes, which was how long each act was). Her death was pronounced at 11:00 p.m., when the carousel was being reset for a new cycle. One of the audience members heard Stone's screams and notified park staff. Others thought it was a part of the show. By the time the audience member and the staff got to her, Stone had already died from her injuries. Stone's parents sued Disneyland for the death of their daughter, which resulted in a small settlement.

Following Stone's death, the attraction was abruptly closed down, remaining closed while Disney installed safety lights and had the area where the incident occurred cleaned. Later, the walls in the theater were remodeled so that they would break away in case a similar accident happened. The attraction reopened on July 11, three days after the incident.

Closure
America Sings was born out of the company's desire to celebrate the United States Bicentennial. It did not quite fit the theme of Tomorrowland, but its relevance to that period in the United States made it appropriate. However, once the Bicentennial was over, the attraction became more misplaced. Disney's Imagineering team began developing new ideas for Tomorrowland, that included a new show in the carousel theater more fitting for the land of the future. Separately, in the summer of 1983, the idea for a log flume attraction for Disneyland that would become Splash Mountain was conceived by Imagineer and Disney Legend Tony Baxter. Knowing America Sings was eventually to close for a more appropriately themed show, the idea developed to give most of America Sings' Audio-Animatronic figures a new home in Splash Mountain.

In 1986, roughly two years before America Sings' impending closure, two Audio-Animatronic geese were taken out of the attraction. Their outer "skin" was removed, leaving only the robotic skeletons. Their heads were then replaced, and they were used as two G2 droids in the queue to Star Tours, which would open in early 1987. One of them (named G2-9T) still sings a modified "I've Been Working on the Railroad" (retitled "I've Been Looking at the Same Bag") in Star Tours: The Adventures Continue. As a result, the geese quartets in Acts 1 and 2 became trios until America Sings closed on April 10, 1988.

Within days of the closure of America Sings, crews began to move most of the Audio-Animatronic figures to Splash Mountain, which opened in the summer of 1989. The rock and roll stork in the finale is now used by Imagineers for training new animatronics programmers, acting as a final exam of sorts. The remainder of the show's Audio-Animatronics were recycled.

The Carousel Theater was used as office space for ten years. During this time, the carousel theater's external appearance was unchanged, and the upper level continued to house the Tron tunnel for the PeopleMover until that attraction ceased to operate in 1995. A large sign in front of the building showed Sorcerer Mickey alongside text reading, "Sorry, we're closed to imagineer a brand new attraction." However, the building was not touched for nearly a decade. For a few years, during the planned "Disney Decade" started by then-Disney CEO Michael Eisner, a new Audio-Animatronic show called Plectu's Fantastic Intergalactic Revue was planned to open. It was to have been an outer space-themed musical-variety revue featuring a troupe of Audio-Animatronics itinerant alien musicians whose spaceship had landed in Tomorrowland. The idea was part of the original "Tomorrowland 2055" plan and was planned to open around 1994. However, Disneyland Paris, which opened in 1992, ended up costing the Disney company billions of dollars putting them in debt, so "Tomorrowland 2055" was scrapped due to budget considerations.

From its closure until 1996, the inside of the lower level of the Carousel Theater was used for storage and office space leaving remnants of sets and backdrops as well as the theater seats. America Sings was replaced in 1998 by Innoventions, a version of the Epcot attraction of the same name, as part of the Tomorrowland update of that year. The building was then redesigned and reopened in 2015 as the Tomorrowland Expo Center, hosting the Star Wars Launch Bay.

Cast
 Burl Ives – Eagle Sam
 Sam Edwards – Ollie Owl
 Rex Allen – "Sombrero" Dog
 Sue Allen – Collegiate Quartet Member
 Mic Bell – Alligator, Biker Bird, "Rattle and Roll" Frog, "Rattle and Roll" Stork
 Ray Campi – Swamp Boy
 Peggy Clark – Collegiate Quartet Member
 Bill Cole – Boothill Boy, Collegiate Quartet Member, Tenor Fox, Singing Goose
 Mac Curtis – Swamp Boy
 Jewel Hall – Biker Chick
 Geary Hanley – Swamp Boy
 Bill Lee – Boothill Boy, Collegiate Quartet Member, Singing Goose
 Diana Lee – "The Wandering Boy's" Mother
 Ray McKinley – Piano Pig
 Gene Merlino – Singing Goose
 Tim Morgan – Rock and Roll Stork
 Lloyd Perryman – "Home on the Range" Dog
 Cheryl Poole – Gilded Cage Chicken
 Jean Ritchie – Mother Opossum
 Scuffy Shew – Convict Fox
 Betty Taylor – Bill Bailey Pig
 Jerry Whitman – Singing Goose
 Chill Wills – Saddlesore Swanson

The songs
Norman "Buddy" Baker arranged a selection of songs chosen to represent a panoramic view of American music.

Intro
 "Yankee Doodle" – Eagle Sam
 "Jeanie with the Light Brown Hair" – Eagle Sam
 "Pop Goes the Weasel" – Ollie Owl and the weasel

Act 1 – The Deep South
 "Dixie" / "L'il Liza Jane" / "Camptown Races" – Geese Quartet (later Geese Trio)
 "My Old Kentucky Home" – Colonel Houndstoothe (Bassett hound in rocking chair)
 "Polly Wolly Doodle" – The Swamp Boys (gator trio, frogs, and harmonica-playing raccoon)
 "Lord I Wish I Was A Single Girl Again" – Mother Possum with babies
 "Down in the Valley" – a Coyote
 "Down by the Riverside" – Hens, Foxes, Swamp Boy Frogs

Act 2 – Headin' West
 "Drill, Ye Tarriers, Drill" / "I've Been Working on the Railroad" / "Fireball Mail" – Geese Quartet (later Geese Trio), a rabbit and a coyote
 "The Old Chisholm Trail" – Saddlesore Swanson (turkey)
 "Who Shot The Hole in My Sombrero?" – Sombrero-wearing dog
 "The End of Billy the Kid" – The Boothill Boys (vulture duo)
 "Home on the Range" – Tex Ranger (dog)

Act 3 – The Gay '90s
 "She May Be Somebody's Mother" / "The Bowery" / "After the Ball" – Geese Quartet
 "Down In The Licensed Saloon" – Geese Quartet & Mother Rabbit
 "(Won't You Come Home) Bill Bailey" – Showgirl Pig
 "Sweet Adeline" – Blossom-Nose Murphy (goose) & Geese Quartet
 "The Old Gray Mare" – The Old Gray Mare & Geese Quartet
 "Only a Bird in a Gilded Cage" – Bird in a Gilded Cage and Fox
 "Ta-ra-ra Boom-de-ay" – Bird in a Gilded Cage, Fox, Storks, Geese Quartets (male and female), Pig, Sam and Ollie

Act 4 – Modern Times
 "Ja-Da" / "Darktown Strutters' Ball" / "Singin' in the Rain" – Geese Quartet
 "A-Tisket, A-Tasket" / "Boo-Hoo" – College Quartet (male wolf, male fox and two female cats)
 "Beat Me Daddy, Eight to the Bar" – Piano Pig
 "Hound Dog" / "See You Later Alligator" – Rooster, Stork, Porcupine, Hound Dog, and Alligator
 "Shake, Rattle and Roll" – Rooster and Frog
 "Twistin' U.S.A." – Motorcycle storks
 "Joy to the World" – Modern Times cast (except Piano Pig and College Quartet)
 “Yankee Doodle” (reprise) – Modern Times cast (except College Quartet)

Epilogue
 "Yankee Doodle" (reprise continued) – Eagle Sam
 "Auld Lang Syne" – Eagle Sam and Ollie
 Exit music: "Stars and Stripes Forever"

References

External links
 Yesterland entry on the show
 Deborah Gail Stone on snopes.com
 Mickey Mouse Park information on America Sings

Amusement rides that closed in 1988
Former Walt Disney Parks and Resorts attractions
Tomorrowland
Audio-Animatronic attractions
Amusement rides introduced in 1974
Disneyland
1974 establishments in California
1988 disestablishments in California